Marcus Taylor (born November 25, 1981) is a retired American professional basketball player.

He was a Naismith All-American, McDonald's All-American, two-time Parade All-American and USA Today 1st-team All-American.  He also went on to win Mr. Basketball of Michigan Award in 2000.

Taylor attended Michigan State University for two seasons before entering the NBA Draft.  In his sophomore season, he became only the second player in Big Ten history to lead the conference in scoring and assists, and the first in MSU history.  He won a gold medal on the FIBA Under-21 World Championship in Saitama, Japan.

Marcus was selected by the Minnesota Timberwolves as the 52nd pick in the 2002 NBA draft. In 2002, Taylor played for the Timberwolves in the Shaw's Pro Summer League and in NBA preseason games. Taylor also played for Washington Wizards in 2003 Reebok Pro Summer League.

Taylor ended up never playing in an NBA game and is 1 of 9 players selected in the 2002 NBA Draft to never play in the league.

Since then he has played for the Sioux Falls Skyforce (CBA), ASVEL Lyon-Villeurbanne (France), MENT Vassilakis (Greece), the Southern Crescent Lightning (WBA), the Albuquerque Thunderbirds (NBDL), the Tulsa 66ers (NBDL), TBB Trier (Germany), and the Anaheim Arsenal (NBDL).  He officially retired from professional basketball in 2011 due to a career ending injury.  Per his LinkedIn page, her currently works at Eli Lilly as a Diabetes Sales Specialist and is President and CEO of Marcus Taylor's Basketball Skills Development.

1981 births
Living people
Albuquerque Thunderbirds players
American expatriate basketball people in France
American expatriate basketball people in Germany
American expatriate basketball people in Greece
American men's basketball players
Anaheim Arsenal players
ASVEL Basket players
Basketball players from Michigan
McDonald's High School All-Americans
MENT B.C. players
Michigan State Spartans men's basketball players
Minnesota Timberwolves draft picks
Parade High School All-Americans (boys' basketball)
Sioux Falls Skyforce (CBA) players
Sportspeople from Lansing, Michigan
Tulsa 66ers players
Point guards